Presidente is a brand of Pilsner beer that is owned and produced by Cervecería Nacional Dominicana (CND) at several breweries in the Dominican Republic. In addition to domestic consumption in the Dominican Republic, Presidente is exported to the United States, Panama, Honduras, Spain, Germany, Switzerland, Italy, Andorra, Aruba, Cuba, Curaçao, Antigua, Belize, Martinique, Guadeloupe, Turks and Caicos, The Bahamas, Saint Martin, British Virgin Islands and Puerto Rico. Varieties include Presidente (5.0% ABV) and Presidente Light (4.3 ABV.)

History
In 1929, U.S. industrialist Charles H. Wanzer with other business partners founded the brewery and started brewing the iconic Dominican beer, Presidente, in 1935. The beer was named in honor of then Dominican president Rafael Leónidas Trujillo. Presidente was initially launched as a dark beer and acquired limited success, yet in the 1960s Presidente was transformed into the pilsner that is recognized today. In 1986, the brewery was acquired by Dominican cigarette company Grupo León Jimenes. In 2012, Anheuser-Busch InBev's Brazilian unit AmBev agreed to buy a controlling stake in the Dominican Republic-based brewer Cerveceria Nacional Dominicana (CND) from Grupo Leon Jimenes for over $2 billion, forming the biggest beverage company in the Caribbean.

Sponsorship partners
Some of Presidente's export partners include the University of Miami Hurricanes, the Miami Marlins, and the Miami Heat. In 2007, Presidente was the official beer of the University of Miami Hurricanes, NCAA football team as well as the now defunct Orange Bowl in Miami. In 2009, Presidente became the Miami Heat's official imported beer. In 2012, Presidente became an official sponsor of the Miami Marlins. It was even mentioned in 2012 by former Marlins Manager, Ozzie Guillén, as a cure after being defeated 15-5 versus the Boston Red Sox: 

Since 2007, Presidente has also hosted Festival Presidente de Música Latina (Presidente Festival of Latin Music), which is a three-day event in October that showcases Dominican and International musical talent. It is held at the Estadio Olímpico Félix Sánchez of Santo Domingo, Dominican Republic.

References

External links
 Presidente Official Website

Beer in the Caribbean
Beer brands
Brands of the Dominican Republic
Economy of the Dominican Republic
Products introduced in 1935